DZGV (99.9 FM), broadcasting as GV 99.9, is a radio station owned and operated by GV Radios Network Corporation, a subsidiary of Apollo Broadcast Investors. The station's studio and transmitter are located at #53 Evangelista St., Batangas City.

GV 99.9 formerly had a sister station based in Sto. Tomas with the call letters DWEG. Initially known as Smile 89.5, it first signed on in 2010 to serve the extreme northern Batangas and western Laguna market. In March 2018, it was converted into a relay of GV 99.9, thus carrying the branding GV Southern Luzon. It went off the air in late 2018 due to cost-cutting measures and its transmitter being disabled by Tropical Storm Usman.

References

Radio stations in Batangas
Radio stations established in 1996